The University of Gdańsk is a public research university located in Gdańsk, Poland. It is one of the top 10 universities in Poland and is also an important centre for the studies of the Kashubian language.

History 
The University of Gdańsk was established in 1970 by a merger of the Higher School of Economics in Sopot (in existence since 1945) and Gdańsk College of Education (formed in 1946). Nowadays, the University of Gdańsk is the largest institution of higher learning in Poland's northern region of Pomerania. The University of Gdańsk boasts significant scientific achievement which enforces its leading position, particularly through activity and research connected with the sea. In this regard, the university has been involved in cooperation with scientific research centres from nearly all corners of the globe.

The University of Gdańsk is involved in the creation of a network of European universities selected in the ‘European Universities’ competition organised by the European Commission in conjunction with its partners, the University of Cádiz (Spain), the University of Split (Croatia), the Université de Bretagne Occidentale (France), Kiel University (Germany) and the University of Malta (Malta), the University of Gdańsk forms a consortium of the European University of the Seas (SEA-EU).

In 2020, the university became a member of the Daniel Fahrenheit Association of Gdańsk Universities (Polish: Związek Uczelni w Gdańsku im. Daniela Fahrenheita) which brings together the city's major institutions of higher education including the Gdańsk University of Technology and the Medical University of Gdańsk. The objective of the newly-established organization is to work on projects aimed at further federalization of the universities, to bolster the scientific cooperation between them and to pursue a common promotional and ranking policy.

Ranking 
The University of Gdańsk has been listed in the most important world rankings, thus joining the ranks of the best Polish universities. Its presence in such international rankings as the QS World University Ranking or the Times Higher Education (THE) World University Ranking is a reflection of the high quality of education, scientific research conducted and increasing international standing as well as  a high level of knowledge transfer to the economy. The dynamic development of the University of Gdańsk is reflected in its presence amongst the world's 200 best young universities in the Times Higher Education (THE) Young University Rankings 2019 in which the University of Gdańsk was the only Polish university to feature.

School authorities 
 Rector: Prof. dr hab. Piotr Stepnowski
 Vice-Rector for International Cooperation: dr hab. Anna Jurkowska-Zeidler
 Vice-Rector for Research: Prof. dr hab. Wiesław Laskowski
 Vice-Rector for Student Affairs and Teaching Quality: dr hab.. Arnold Kłonczyński
 Vice-Rector for Innovations and Cooperation with Business and Industry: Prof. dr hab. Krzysztof Bielawski
 Director of Administration: mgr Jacek Jętczak

Staff 
 Professors: 282
 Habilitation doctors: 171
 Senior lecturers: 640
 Teachers (total): 1,700
 Total staff: 2,964

Notable professors and lecturers affiliated with the University of Gdańsk:
 Stefan Chwin, novelist, literary critic
 Andrzej Gąsiorowski, political scientist
 Zbigniew Herbert, poet, essayist and moralist
 Ryszard Horodecki, physicist
 Maria Janion, theoretician of literature, feminist
 Janusz Lewandowski, politician and economist, former Budget and Financial Programming Commissioner of the European Commission
 Małgorzata Omilanowska, historian and politician, former Minister of Culture and National Heritage of Poland
 Jerzy Samp, writer and publicist
 Joanna Senyszyn, politician
 Brunon Synak, sociologist
 Jerzy Treder, linguist
 Marek Żukowski, theoretical physicist

Number of students 
 Day studies: 15,151
 Evening studies: 3,753
 Extramural studies: 10,884
 Doctoral studies: 1,609
 Total: 27,233

Levels of study offered by institution 
 Shorter/intermediate university level qualifications
 First main university level final qualifications
 Advanced/postgraduate study
 Doctorate
 Higher/post doctorate

Diplomas and degrees 
 Bachelor – B.A.
 Master of Arts – M.A.
 Doctor – Dr
 Doctor Habilitated – Dr hab.

International cooperation 
 Copenhagen Business School – Denmark
 NEOMA Business School – France
 Hiroshima University – Japan
 Katholieke Universiteit Leuven – Belgium
 Lumière University Lyon 2 – France
 University of Antwerp – Belgium
 University of Beira Interior – Portugal
 Universität Bremen – Germany
 University of Linköping – Sweden
 University of Messina – Italy
 University of Plymouth – United Kingdom
 Universität Rostock – Germany
 University of Turku – Finland
 University of Washington's School of Marine Affairs (SMA) – United States of America
 Sholokhov Moscow State University for Humanities – Russia
 University of Applied Sciences Upper Austria – Austria

Faculties 
 Faculty of Biology
 Faculty of Chemistry
 Faculty of Economics
 Faculty of History
 Faculty of Languages
 Faculty of Law and Administration
 Faculty of Management
 Faculty of Mathematics, physics and Informatics
 Faculty of Oceanography and Geography
 Faculty of Social science
 Intercollegiate Faculty of Biotechnology (with Medical University of Gdańsk)

Notable alumni 

Other notable alumni include:

 Paweł Adamowicz (1965–2019), former Mayor of Gdańsk
 Marek Biernacki (born 1959), lawyer and politician
 Kamil Bortniczuk (born 1983), Polish Minister of Sport and Tourism
 Andrzej Butkiewicz (1955–2008), political activist opposing Communism in Poland during the 1970s and 1980s, member of the Solidarity Movement
 Selim Chazbijewicz (born 1955), political scientist, columnist, and poet
 Stefan Chwin (born 1949), Polish novelist, literary critic, and historian of literature
 Tadeusz Cymański (born 1955), politician
 Piotr Domaradzki (1946–2015), Polish-American journalist, essayist and historian 
 Aleksandra Dulkiewicz (born 1979), lawyer and current Mayor of Gdańsk
 Jacek Gdański (born 1970), chess grandmaster and the 1992 Polish Chess Champion
 Abelard Giza (born 1980), comedian and screenwriter
 Ryszard Horodecki (born 1943), physicist known for the Peres–Horodecki criterion
 Pawel Huelle (born 1957), writer and journalist
 Maria Kaczyńska (1942–2010) , former First Lady of Poland
 Wojciech Kasperski (born 1981), screenwriter, film director and producer
 Aneta Kręglicka (born 1965), dancer, Miss World 1989
 Janusz Lewandowski (born 1951), former Budget and Financial Programming Commissioner of the European Commission 
 Marta Lewicka (born 1972), Polish-American mathematician
 Jakobe Mansztajn (born 1982), poet, blogger
 Maciej Płażyński (1958–2010) , politician, one of the founders of the Civic Platform party
 Monika Pyrek (born 1980), a Polish pole vaulter
 Jerzy Samp (1951–2015), writer and publicist
 Wojciech Szczurek (born 1963), mayor of Gdynia
 Elżbieta Zawacka (1909–2009), university professor, scouting instructor, SOE agent and freedom fighter during World War II. She was also a brigadier general of the Polish Army (the second and last woman in the history of the Polish Army to hold this rank)
 Maciej Żylicz (born 1953), biochemist and molecular biologist

See also
 Kashubian studies
 List of universities in Poland

References

 
Gdansk
Gdansk
1970 establishments in Poland